Craig Martin (born January 21, 1971) is a Canadian former professional ice hockey right winger who played two seasons in the National Hockey League for the Winnipeg Jets and Florida Panthers.

Career 
Martin was drafted 98th overall by the Jets in the 1990 NHL Entry Draft. He played 20 regular season games for the Jets during the 1994–95 NHL season, scoring one assist with 19 penalty minutes. Martin played one more game for the Florida Panthers in the 1996–97 NHL season, collecting five penalty minutes.

In July 2018, Martin was inducted into the Multi-Ethnic Sports Hall of Fame along with two other Black former professional players from Amherst. Bill Riley and Mark McFarlane.

Career statistics

References

External links

1971 births
Adirondack IceHawks players
Adirondack Red Wings players
Bakersfield Condors (1998–2015) players
Berlin Capitals players
Black Nova Scotians
Black Canadian ice hockey players
Canadian expatriate ice hockey players in Germany
Canadian ice hockey right wingers
Carolina Monarchs players
Florida Panthers players
Hull Olympiques players
Ice hockey people from Nova Scotia
Living people
Manitoba Moose (IHL) players
Moncton Hawks players
Phoenix Mustangs players
Quebec Rafales players
Springfield Falcons players
San Antonio Dragons players
Winnipeg Jets (1979–1996) draft picks
Winnipeg Jets (1979–1996) players